Calliobasis gemmata  is a species of sea snail, a marine gastropod mollusk in the family Seguenziidae.

Original description
Poppe G.T., Tagaro S.P. & Stahlschmidt P. (2015). New shelled molluscan species from the central Philippines I. Visaya. 4(3): 15–59.
page(s): 18, pl. 3 figs 1–2.

References

External links
 Worms Link

gemmata
Gastropods described in 2015